James Blake Litherland (born 26 September 1988) is an English musician, singer, songwriter, and record producer. He first received recognition for a series of 2010 EPs including CMYK and Klavierwerke, and he released his self-titled debut album in 2011 to critical praise. His second album Overgrown was released in 2013, bringing him to international attention, and later was awarded the Mercury Prize. In 2016, he released his third album The Colour in Anything and his fourth album Assume Form in 2019, both receiving positive reviews and the latter becoming his highest-peaking album in the US Billboard 200, at number 21.

During his career, he has collaborated with artists including Mount Kimbie and Bon Iver and has contributed production work to artists such as Kendrick Lamar, Beyoncé, Vince Staples, Frank Ocean, Rosalía and Travis Scott. He has won a Mercury Prize from two nominations, a Grammy Award from six nominations, including for Best New Artist in 2014; a Latin Grammy Award and three Brit Award nominations.

Early life
Blake is the son of musician James Litherland and Helen Litherland, and showed a strong interest and aptitude in music from a young age. He received classical training in piano as a child, and completed primary education at Grange Park Primary School, Winchmore Hill and secondary education at The Latymer School, Edmonton. Later on, he attended Goldsmiths, University of London, where he received a degree in Popular Music. While at school, Blake and friends hosted a series of "Bass Society" music nights that featured UK artists such as Distance, Skream and Benga.

Career

2009–2010: Early releases
Blake began his music career by releasing his debut 12" record, entitled "Air & Lack Thereof" in the United Kingdom during July 2009, while being persistent in recording songs in his bedroom. Having been released on the imprint record label, Hemlock, the extended play became a favourite of BBC Radio 1 DJ Gilles Peterson. Soon after the release of the record Blake was invited by Peterson to do a special mix on his international show, including an exclusive Mount Kimbie track. As a second-year composition assignment for his studies at Goldsmiths, he submitted the Klavierwerke EP which was awarded high marks.

A third EP, entitled CMYK, was released through R&S Records during 2010. The title track, "CMYK" was selected by BBC Radio 1 DJ Nick Grimshaw as his Record of the Week and also received airplay from other DJs. On 29 September 2010, Zane Lowe selected Blake's cover version of "Limit to Your Love" as his "Hottest Record in the World". The song was written and originally recorded by Feist and appeared on her studio album, The Reminder. The single was released in the United Kingdom on 28 November 2010, where it debuted on the UK Singles Chart at number 47.

2011: Self-titled album

Blake was nominated for the BBC's Sound of 2011, an annual poll that highlights the forthcoming year's likely successful musicians; he was eventually placed second, ahead of fellow shortlisted acts; The Vaccines, Jamie Woon and Clare Maguire. It was also revealed on 15 December 2010 that Blake had been made the runner-up behind singer-songwriter Jessie J at the BRIT Awards' "Critic's Choice". In January 2011, Blake was awarded Single of the Year (2010) for "CMYK" at Gilles Peterson's Worldwide Awards. Blake's work found itself on numerous 2010 year-end best-of lists, with "CMYK" ranking 24th on Frontier Psychiatrists top 40 songs of the year, the Bells Sketch/CMYK/Klavierwerke EPs ranking 8th on Pitchfork Media's top 50 albums of 2010, and "I Only Know (What I Know Now)" ranking 8th on Pitchfork's top 100 tracks of 2010.

Blake revealed in late December 2010 that his album would be self-titled, and the 11-track James Blake was released on 7 February 2011. Only days after the original announcement was made, the album was leaked onto the internet. On 9 January 2011, "The Wilhelm Scream" was trailed as the album's second single ("Limit To Your Love" was also included on the album). In February 2011, Blake first appeared on the cover of the publication The Fader, in its 72nd issue. Blake debuted a collaboration with Bon Iver called "Fall Creek Boys Choir" in August 2011 and during the next month, the BBC released an exclusive mix by Blake, which included 10 of his unreleased songs. These included "Deeds", "Olivia Kept", and "Evening Fell Hard for Us". During the final weeks of 2012, Blake performed three "intimate" shows where he debuted new songs.

Later that year, Blake released both the Enough Thunder and Love What Happened Here EPs in 2011. These EPs, noticeably more structured than his previous releases, featured R&B-tinged work as opposed to the experimental electronic style found on CMYK.

2012–2013: Overgrown

Early in 2012, Blake spent time with American rapper Kanye West (who named Blake as his favourite artist) and singer Justin Vernon. Later that year, Blake announced a new collaborative non-single release under the moniker Harmonimix with British rapper Trim; the single "Confidence Boost/Saying" was released on 24 September 2012. Also in 2012, Blake and friends (including Foat, Nick Sigsworth, and touring musicians Rob McAndrews and Ben Assiter) secured a residency at the club Plastic People as the collective 1-800 Dinosaur, hosting a series of impromptu dance nights. In summer 2013, the collective launched a label of the same name, on which Blake and other artists released material.

His second album, Overgrown, was released on 5 April 2013. The first single from the album, "Retrograde", was debuted the same day on BBC Radio 1, and was released on 11 February. On 25 February, the track listing and album art were revealed. It was selected as Variance Magazine's Album of the Year as of December 2013. The album features guest appearances from noted electronic music producer Brian Eno and rapper RZA of Wu-Tang Clan. The release received critical acclaim and was awarded the 2013 Mercury Prize. Blake revealed to Hot Press that falling in love had influenced the warm nu-soul sound on the album, as opposed to the experimentalism found on his self-titled effort. A remix featuring Chance the Rapper, of a track from Overgrown, "Life Round Here", was released on 11 October alongside a music video directed by Nabil Elderkin.

2014–2017: The Colour in Anything

In an interview with Spotify, Blake revealed that a day prior to the release of Drake's single "0 to 100 / The Catch Up", he received an email asking whether a beat from one of his older tracks could be used on the single; he refused and asked Drake's label to remove the sample. Blake's publisher later approached him and asked him about his decision. Blake in return asked how much money he had lost by turning down the offer and reportedly spat out his drink when he found out.

In December 2014, during his BBC Radio 1 Residency, Blake announced that his third studio album would be titled Radio Silence and would be released in the first half of 2015. He later confirmed that the album would feature Bon Iver and Kanye West, as well as feature guitar work from Connan Mockasin.
Blake received a Grammy Award nomination in 2014 for Best New Artist.

On 11 February 2016, Blake premiered a new song entitled "Modern Soul" during his BBC Radio 1 residency. On 14 April 2016, Blake revealed during a surprise hosting spot on BBC Radio 1 that he'd finished the album, and that it was 18 tracks in length. He stated that it includes one track that stretches to 20 minutes in length. Later in the broadcast he premiered a new song titled 'Timeless', though did not say whether it would be included on the album. In a May 2016 interview with BBC Radio 1, Blake stated that he began work on the album in England, and after "running out of steam" went to the United States to complete the recording at Shangri La Studios with producer Rick Rubin.

Blake produced and was featured on the song "Forward" from Beyoncé's 2016 album Lemonade. He also co-wrote the album's opening track, "Pray You Catch Me". On 28 April, social media posts by Blake and his label, 1-800 Dinosaur, reposted photos of a mural by children's novel illustrator Sir Quentin Blake (best known for his work with writer Roald Dahl) that hinted at the new album title The Colour in Anything; this was confirmed as the title of his new album several days later. The album was released on 6 May 2016.

Blake collaborated with Jay-Z on his album 4:44, handling the production on two of the three bonus tracks off the album and was also featured on the bonus track "MaNyfaCedGod". He also handled production on Kendrick Lamar's song "Element" as the original version of the track sounded "a little too jazzy". On 2 September 2016, Blake released a remix of "Timeless" featuring Vince Staples which had already been leaked on the internet earlier. In December 2017, Blake released a cover of the song "Vincent" by Don McLean alongside a performance video shot in the studio.

2018–2020: Assume Form

On 11 January 2018, Blake co-wrote and performed alongside Jay Rock, Kendrick Lamar, and Future on the single "King's Dead" from Rock's album Redemption and the soundtrack Black Panther: The Album. The song was commercially successful, reaching number 21 in the United States and number 50 in the United Kingdom; later, the song (alongside Anderson .Paak's "Bubblin") would receive the Grammy Award For Best Rap Performance at the 2019 ceremony. Blake also appeared on another track from the Black Panther soundtrack album, "Bloody Waters", which Blake co-wrote alongside Lamar, Mark Spears, Robin Braun and Ab-Soul.

On 26 January 2018, Blake released a new single, "If the Car Beside You Moves Ahead", alongside its music video, having premiered at his BBC Radio 1 residency. Blake's second solo single of that year, "Don't Miss It", was shared on 24 May alongside a lyric video and was released the next month. Despite receiving acclaim from music critics, a less positive review by Kevin Lozano of Pitchfork described the track as "sad boy music" prompted a response from Blake, who said "I can't help but notice, as I do whenever I talk about my feelings in a song, that the words 'sad boy' are used to describe it. I've always found that expression to be unhealthy and problematic when used to describe men just openly talking about their feelings."

Blake mixed and worked on additional production on the ninth album by American electronic musician Oneohtrix Point Never, titled Age Of, which was released in June 2018. He also co-wrote and was featured on the track "Stop Trying to Be God" from Travis Scott's third studio album, Astroworld, and made an appearance in the song's music video.

In December 2018, Blake announced that he would be embarking on a tour of North America in February/March 2019. People who had purchased tickets for the North America tour also received a copy of his forthcoming album. Later that month Blake teased new material with André 3000 during a show in Brooklyn, his second collaboration with the artist after "Look Ma No Hands" on which Blake provided the piano part, which was released earlier that year. In early January 2019, Amazon.fr accidentally leaked details of Blake's fourth album, Assume Form, including its track listing and a list of features including collaborations with André 3000, Travis Scott and Metro Boomin. Soon after, LED billboards appeared in London and New York promoting the album. The album's release date was later confirmed to be on 18 January 2019 due to advertising in the London Underground. The day prior to the album's release, Blake released the tracks "Mile High" featuring Travis Scott and Metro Boomin and "Lullaby for My Insomniac", respectively. Following the album's release, the tracks "Barefoot in the Park" and "Mulholland", the latter of which is only included on the vinyl version of Assume Form, were released as singles on 4 and 26 April respectively, the former accompanied by a music video.

Blake released several new tracks throughout 2020, including "You're Too Precious", as well as the Before EP in October.

2021–present: Friends That Break Your Heart
Blake released his fifth album, Friends That Break Your Heart, on 8 October 2021. The 12-track album includes features from SZA, JID, Slowthai, and Monica Martin.
He also is featured on JID's, "The Forever Story"

Personal life
Blake was previously in a relationship with American musician Theresa Wayman from the indie rock band Warpaint. , Blake has been in a relationship with British actress Jameela Jamil.

Musical style
Blake is a baritone. Blake's early releases are fragmented electronic works influenced by UK dance and bass styles (such as 2-step and the stark dubstep of Burial and Digital Mystikz), as well as '90s trip hop and American R&B artists such as Stevie Wonder, Sly Stone, and D'Angelo. On his acclaimed trio of 2010 EPs (The Bells Sketch, CMYK and Klavierwerke), Blake's own voice is obscured or processed in favor of vocal samples from '90s R&B, prominent sub-bass frequencies, and minimal, jittery rhythms. During this period, Blake's work was tagged by journalists as "post-dubstep", alluding to his movement beyond the style's characteristics. By the time of his 2011 debut album, Blake's vocals and piano had become more prominent while traditional song structures became increasingly apparent, reflecting the influence of gospel, soul and ambient music. His second album Overgrown (2013) continued this trend, integrating an electronic approach with balladry and Blake's soul-inflected vocals, and featuring contributions from hip hop artist RZA and electronic musician Brian Eno.

Discussing his stylistic development in 2013, critic Mark Fisher wrote that "listening back to Blake's records in chronological sequence is like hearing a ghost gradually assume material form; or it's like hearing the song form (re)coalescing out of digital ether." Author Madison Moore noted the prominent use of minimalism, sparseness, and silence in Blake's work, a quality also noted by Eno in 2013: "he takes a lot of stuff out and ends up with very skeletal pieces."

Discography

Studio albums
 James Blake (2011)
 Overgrown (2013)
 The Colour in Anything (2016)
 Assume Form (2019)
 Friends That Break Your Heart (2021)
 Wind Down (2022)

Awards and nominations
On 19 July 2011, Blake was nominated for the Mercury Music Prize 2011 for his self-titled debut album; the award was won by PJ Harvey. However, in 2013, he was nominated again for Overgrown, and subsequently won the award, the result being announced on 30 October. The judges at the event described his album as "...late-night music for the digital age. An inventive, poignant and poetic record of great beauty." He was also nominated for Best New Artist at the 2014 Grammy Awards.

References

External links

1988 births
Living people
A&M Records artists
Alumni of Goldsmiths, University of London
Dubstep musicians
English electronic musicians
English record producers
English male singer-songwriters
Grammy Award winners for rap music
Ivor Novello Award winners
People educated at The Latymer School
People from the London Borough of Enfield
Polydor Records artists
Post-dubstep musicians
Singers from London
21st-century English singers
English soul musicians